Santa Teresa Airport  is an airport serving the village of Santa Teresa in Amambay Department, Paraguay.

See also

 List of airports in Paraguay
 Transport in Paraguay

References

External links
 HERE Maps - Santa Teresa
 OpenStreetMap - Santa Teresa
 Skyvector Aeronautical Charts - Santa Teresa

Airports in Paraguay